Arnon Milchan (December 6, 1944) is an Israeli businessman, film producer and spy. He has been involved in over 130 full-length motion pictures and is the founder of production company Regency Enterprises. Regency's film credits include 12 Years a Slave, JFK, Heat, Fight Club, and Mr. & Mrs. Smith. Milchan has earned two nominations for the Academy Award for Best Picture, for L.A. Confidential and The Revenant. Milchan was also an Israeli intelligence operative from the mid-1960s to the mid-1980s.

Biography 
Milchan was born in Rehovot, then-British Mandate of Palestine, to a Jewish family. He has a sister named Dalia. His mother was descended from European Jewish disciples of the rabbi Vilna Gaon who came to Palestine in the early 19th century, and he is the eighth generation of his family in the country.

Milchan was first married to French model, Brigitte Genmaire, and later divorced. The couple had three children, Elinor, Alexandra, and Yariv. Elinor Milchan is a professional photographer and Alexandra is a film producer. He later married South African retired professional tennis player Amanda Coetzer and had two children with her (Shimon and Olivia).

Israeli Prime Minister Benjamin Netanyahu asked U.S. Secretary of State John Kerry three times in 2014 to arrange a long-term visa for Milchan to live in the United States. Milchan does not live in Israel and has not been there since 2016.

Business career 
His father owned a fertilizer company, which Milchan inherited at the age of 21 upon his father's sudden death. Over the years, Milchan turned the company into a successful chemical business. He also earned a degree from the London School of Economics, before he and his company (Milchan Brothers Ltd.) were recruited to Lekem, a secret Israeli intelligence organization responsible for obtaining technology and material for Israel's nuclear program, and other highly secretive programs.

Film production career

Milchan became involved in the movie business in 1977, after an introduction to American producer Elliot Kastner. In 1981 he partnered with Sydney Pollack on the US miniseries Masada Most notable among Milchan's film collaborations was his early work with Martin Scorsese. He developed close friendships with Robert De Niro, and directors Roman Polanski, Sergio Leone, Terry Gilliam and Oliver Stone. Milchan started his own production company in 1991 called New Regency Productions. Through his company Regency, in partnership with Warner Bros., and later with Rupert Murdoch at 20th Century Fox, and other business ventures, such as Puma AG, Milchan acquired a net worth estimated at $5.1 billion .

Milchan has produced over 130 films, such as Noah (2014), 12 Years a Slave (2013), Once Upon a Time in America (1984) (in which he also makes a cameo appearance as the chauffeur), Brazil (1985), Pretty Woman (1990), JFK (1991), Under Siege (1992), Natural Born Killers (1994), Boys on the Side (1995), Heat (1995), L.A. Confidential (1997), Fight Club (1999), Unfaithful (2002), Mr. and Mrs. Smith (2005), and Knight and Day (2010), among others, to his credit. He was a producer on two more recent Oscar-winners for Best Picture, 12 Years a Slave in 2014 and Birdman in 2015, but he was not listed as a producer in the nominees list.

Milchan is also the owner of the WTA broadcasting rights. He was married to model Brigitte Genmaire. He is now married to former South African tennis professional Amanda Coetzer. He is owner of the network which transmits Israeli television programming to the United States and Canada. He is also a part owner of Israel's TV Channel 10, and a former owner of Puma, the international sportswear line.

Intelligence career 
Speculation about Milchan's involvement in arms dealing and intelligence activities was sparked after the indictment in 1985 of Dr. Richard Kelly Smyth, an aerospace executive and scientist who had made illegal shipments of Krytrons, which could be used as nuclear weapon triggers, through one of Milchan's companies.  This remained largely in the category of rumor until biographers Meir Doron and Joseph Gelman wrote a controversial unauthorized biography of Milchan that was published in July 2011. The biography Confidential, which is largely sympathetic to Milchan, revealed in detail how he involved himself in espionage, big-ticket arms-dealing, and obtaining sensitive technology and materials for Israel's nuclear weapons program.  The research in Confidential – The Life Of Secret Agent Turned Hollywood Tycoon established that "at least through the mid-1980s [Milchan] was a full-fledged operative for Israel's top-secret intelligence agency, Lekem.  His activities included "buying components to build and maintain Israel's nuclear arsenal" and supervising "government-backed accounts and front companies that financed the special needs of the entirety of Israel's intelligence operations outside the country". Interviewed regarding Milchan's intelligence activities, Israeli President Shimon Peres stated:

Two years later, on November 25, 2013, on Israel's channel 2 documentary program , Milchan confirmed on camera the central claims in the book Confidential that had been released earlier. The announcement caused international interest in the story and was covered widely.

Peres, the architect of Israel's secret nuclear weapons program in the 1960s, stated that in the 1960s he recruited Milchan to work for the Israeli Bureau of Scientific Relations (LEKEM or LAKAM), a secret intelligence organization tasked with obtaining military technology and science espionage. Milchan acknowledged that he was a secret arms dealer for the Israeli government and claimed to have used his connections to promote the apartheid regime in South Africa in exchange for it helping Israel to acquire uranium for its  nuclear program.

Controversy 
In February 2018, Israeli Police recommended that Arnon Milchan, alongside Israeli Prime Minister, Benjamin Netanyahu, be charged with bribery. The recommendation in the case, nicknamed "Case 1000", relates to alleged bribes Milchan provided to Netanyahu in exchange for special tax exemption legislation believed to benefit Milchan in his homeland of Israel. The proposed legislation, nicknamed "Milchan's Law", dates back to 2013 and was an alleged ploy to extend Milchan's status as a returning resident to allow him to take advantage of tax breaks. According to the police, the gifts from Milchan were worth more than 1 million shekels. Milchan had held fundraisers for Netanyahu, which included a 2014 event at a residence on Carbon Beach in Malibu that controversially inconvenienced residents and commuters with hours of unexpected lane blockages on Pacific Coast Highway, despite being a private event.

Art collecting 
Milchan is an art collector, and in April 2015, CNBC ranked him at No. 3 in their list of "Hollywood's top 10 art collectors" with a collection valued at $600 million, equal with George Lucas, ranked No. 2, but some way behind David Geffen at No. 1, with a collection valued at $2.3 billion.

Production companies 
 Embassy International Pictures N.V. (1982–1989)
 Regency International Pictures (1989–1991)
 Alcor Films (1991–1995)
 Regency Enterprises (1991–)
 New Regency Productions (1991–)

Filmography

20th Century Fox

Producer

Executive producer

Fox Searchlight Pictures

20th Century Studios

Warner Bros.

Producer

Executive producer

TriStar Pictures

Amazon Studios

Others

 Miscellaneous crew

 As an actor

 Thanks

Television

See also 

 List of billionaires

References

Further reading 
 Doron, Meir; Gelman, Joseph (2011) Confidential The Life of Secret Agent Turned Hollywood Tycoon – Arnon Milchan Gefen Books, New York.

External links 
 Forbes.com: Forbes World's Richest People
 

1944 births
Alumni of the London School of Economics
Filmmakers who won the Best Film BAFTA Award
Israeli art collectors
Israeli billionaires
Israeli businesspeople
Israeli film producers
Israeli Jews
Israeli people of Lithuanian-Jewish descent
Israeli people of Polish-Jewish descent
Israeli spies
Golden Globe Award-winning producers
Living people